Thomas H. Conover was a United States Navy officer born in New Jersey in 1794. He was one of the first officers to be promoted to the rank of Commodore on July 16, 1862. Conover died on September 25, 1864.

References

United States Navy officers
1794 births
1864 deaths